"Engine Engine #9" is a song written and recorded by American country music artist Roger Miller. It was released in May 1965 as the lead single from the album, The 3rd Time Around. The song peaked at number 2 on the U.S. country singles chart.

The song was most famously quoted in rap duo Black Sheep's song "The Choice Is Yours (Revisited)", an extended version of another song, "The Choice Is Yours".  This quote refers to the MTA NYC # 9 subway line that used to exist.

Chart performance

References

1965 singles
Roger Miller songs
Songs written by Roger Miller
Song recordings produced by Jerry Kennedy
Mercury Records singles
1965 songs